The Congress of Chilpancingo, also known as the Congress of Anáhuac, was the first, independent congress that replaced the  Assembly of Zitácuaro, formally declaring itself independent from the Spanish crown. It was held in Chilpancingo, in what is the modern-day Mexican state of Guerrero, from September 1813 to November 1813. It was here where the first national constitution was ratified. It was composed of representatives of the provinces under its control and charged with considering a political and social program which it outlined in a document entitled Sentimientos de la Nación (Feelings of the Nation) which expressed the sentiment of Creole Nationalism.  According to historian D. A. Brading, "Creole patriotism, which began as the articulation of the social identity of American Spaniards, was transmuted into the insurgent ideology of Mexican nationalism."

Ignacio López Rayón assumed leadership of Miguel Hidalgo's remaining forces in Saltillo after receiving news of his capture and fled south towards Zitácuaro where he would meet with José María Morelos. Lopez would go on to establish and become President of the Assembly of Zitácuaro along with Morelos. Weak administrative power and losing the battle of Zitácuaro, would lead to the establishment of a new governmental body.

On September 13, 1813, the Congress, with Morelos present, endorsed Mexico's declaration of independence from Spain, established the Catholic religion and drafted a Constitution, creating the legislative, executive and judicial branches of government.  The Congress declared respect for property but confiscated the goods of the Spaniards. It abolished slavery and all class and racial social distinctions in favor of the title "American" for all native-born individuals. Torture, monopolies and the system of tributes were also abolished. Morelos was offered the title Generalissimo with the style of address "Your Highness", but he refused these and asked to be called Siervo de la Nación (Servant of the Nation).

After some military defeats, the Congress met again in Apatzingán, and on October 22 promulgated the Decreto Constitucional para la Libertad de la América Mexicana (Constitutional Decree for the Liberty of Mexican America). This established a weak executive and a powerful legislature, the opposite of what Morelos had called for. He nevertheless conceded that it was the best he could hope for under the circumstances.

On November 6, the deputies to the Congress signed the first legal document where the separation of the New Spain with respect to the Spanish rule is proclaimed. The name of this document is Acta Solemne de la Declaración de Independencia de la América Septentrional (Solemn Act of the Declaration of Independence of Northern America).

See also
 Creole nationalism
 History of democracy in Mexico
Solemn Act of the Declaration of Independence of Northern America
Mexican War of Independence
Constitution of Apatzingán
Sentimientos de la Nación
New Spain

Notes

References
Guedea, Virginia (February 2000) "The Process of Mexican Independence" The American Historical Review 105(1): pp. 116–130.
Vazquez, Josefina Zoraida (March 1999) "The Mexican Declaration of Independence" The Journal of American History 85(4): pp. 1362–1369.

Mexican War of Independence
1813 in New Spain
September 1813 events
October 1813 events
November 1813 events